Uğur Arslan Kuru (born 16 February 1989) is a Turkish football player who plays for TFF Second League club Arnavutköy Belediyespor.

Career
He began football in 2001 at Düzce G.Birliği, before joining Düzce Belediye Spor in 2002 as a youth player. One year later, he joined Fenerbahçe on an amateur contract where he played from 2003 to 2007 as youth player. In 2008, he signed his first professional contract with Fenerbahçe.

He played 35 times for National youth teams as U19, U18, U17 and U16 national teams.

External links

1989 births
People from Düzce
Living people
Turkish footballers
Turkey youth international footballers
Association football defenders
Fenerbahçe S.K. footballers
Balıkesirspor footballers
Altınordu F.K. players
Büyükşehir Belediye Erzurumspor footballers
Aydınspor footballers
Giresunspor footballers
Gaziantep F.K. footballers
Akhisarspor footballers
1461 Trabzon footballers
Tarsus Idman Yurdu footballers
TFF First League players
TFF Second League players
TFF Third League players